Fairfax Memorial Park is a family owned and operated cemetery located in Fairfax, Virginia, United States. The cemetery was founded in 1957 by Cornelius H. Doherty, Sr.

The cemetery was opened in 1969 to provide space for Catholics in the area who required a Catholic burial, but it is now a secular cemetery. The cemetery, along with its associated funeral home, is now owned by Houston-based conglomerate, 
Carriage Services.

Notable burials

 Antonin Scalia (March 11, 1936 – February 13, 2016): United States Supreme Court Associate Justice. He served as an Associate Justice of the United States Supreme Court from 1986 until his death.
 William Lloyd Scott (July 1, 1915 – February 14, 1997): US Congressman, US Senator. He served as a representative from Virginia in the United States House of Representatives from 1967 to 1973 and in the United States Senate from 1973 to 1979.
Robert Bork (March 1, 1927 – December 19, 2012): Solicitor General of the United States and Judge of the United States Court of Appeals for the District of Columbia Circuit.

References

Cemeteries in Virginia
Buildings and structures in Fairfax, Virginia
1957 establishments in Virginia